Ernest Cheston was a rugby union international who represented England from 1873 to 1876.

Early life
Ernest Cheston was born on 24 October 1848 in Hackney the sixth son of Chester Cheston of Clapton. He attended Haileybury and Imperial Service College where he was the captain of the school rugby XX. He went on to study at Merton College, Oxford, from 1 February 1868 to 1872 where he was captain of the Boat Club.

Rugby union career
Cheston made his international debut on 3 March 1873 at Hamilton Crescent, Glasgow in the Scotland vs England match. Of the five matches he played for his national side he was on the winning side on three occasions. He played his final match for England on 6 March 1876 at The Oval in the England vs Scotland match.

Career
Cheston became a solicitor operating from Great Winchester Street.

References

1848 births
1918 deaths
Oxford University RFC players
English rugby union players
England international rugby union players
People educated at Haileybury and Imperial Service College
Rugby union forwards
Alumni of Merton College, Oxford
Richmond F.C. players
People from Hackney Central
Rugby union players from London